Jamesoniella undulifolia, the marsh flapwort,  or marsh earwort, is a species of liverwort in the Jungermanniaceae family. It is found in Austria, China, the Czech Republic, Denmark, Finland, France, Germany, Greenland, North Korea, Norway, Poland, Russia, Sweden, Switzerland, and the United Kingdom. Its natural habitat is swamps. It is threatened by habitat loss.

Sources 

Jungermanniales
Vulnerable plants
Flora of Europe
Flora of Asia
Taxonomy articles created by Polbot